WVVE may refer to:

 WFNX (FM), a radio station (95.3 FM) licensed to serve Grand Marais, Minnesota, United States, which held the call sign WVVE from 2018 to 2020
 WYYX, a radio station (97.7 FM) licensed to serve Bonifay, Florida, United States, which held the call sign WVVE from 2016 to 2017
 WWLY, a radio station (100.1 FM) licensed to serve Panama City Beach, Florida, which held the call sign WVVE from 2002 to 2016
 WMOS, a radio station (102.3 FM) licensed to serve Stonington, Connecticut, United States, which held the call sign WVVE from 1987 to 2000
 WORO (FM), a radio station (92.5 FM) licensed to serve Corozal, Puerto Rico, which held the call sign WVVE from 1968 to 1977